The 2001–02 season was Stoke City's 95th season in the Football League and the eighth in the third tier.

After two failed attempts to gain promotion via the play-offs the pressure was now on Gudjon Thordarson to achieve automatic promotion. Graham Kavanagh was sold for £1 million as well as fan favourite Peter Thorne to Cardiff City and with the money raised Stoke went out and brought some useful additions. After a slow start City went on a 10 match unbeaten run which was brought to a halt by Wigan in November. In January Stoke lost their form and fell away from automatic promotion places and it became clear that it would be the play-offs again for Stoke. And it was Cardiff who were Stoke's opponents with the first leg ending in a 2–1 win for the "Bluebirds" and it seemed that in the second leg Cardiff would hold on for a goalless draw but two very late goals gave Stoke a famous victory and they went to secure promotion by beating Brentford 2–0 in the final. It was not enough however for Gudjon Thordarson to be offered a new contract.

Season review

League
The pressure was now on manager Gudjon Thordarson to finally end Stoke's spell in the Second Division with the owners wanting the club to start progressing through to the Premiership. First task Gudjon did was to sell key midfielder Graham Kavanagh to big spending Cardiff City for £1 million and with that money he brought in six new players, defender Peter Handyside from Grimsby Town who was made captain, goalkeeper Neil Cutler, Belarusian defender Sergei Shtanyuk, Belgian midfielder Jurgen Vandeurzen, David Rowson from Aberdeen and most impressively former Dutch international Peter Hoekstra. The season didn't get off the best of starts with Stoke losing 1–0 away at Queens Park Rangers but two wins over Northampton and Cambridge kick started Stoke's season. Stoke then drew 1–1 at home to Huddersfield Town with Peter Thorne scoring a 90th-minute equaliser, it proved to be his last act in a Stoke shirt as he left to join Kavanagh at Cardiff. With Stoke's main goal threat sold supporters questioned where the goals would come from, thankfully for Stoke they would be spread across the side.

After the departure of Thorne Stoke went on a fine run of results going 10 matches unbeaten putting them firmly in the hunt for automatic promotion but the run was ended by a thumping 6–1 defeat at Wigan Athletic. Stoke recovered well beating Wycombe Wanderers 5–1 but just three wins in 14 saw Stoke's grip on the top two loosen. Matters were not helped when Souleymane Oularé brought into replace Thorne suffered a life-threatening blood clot after just one appearance. With automatic promotion looking unlikely due to the form of Brighton & Hove Albion and Reading, Stoke concentrated on cementing their position in the play-offs and that's what they managed finishing the season in 5th position.

Their opponents in the play-offs were Cardiff City and the first leg at the Britannia Stadium didn't go well for Stoke with Leo Fortune-West and Robert Earnshaw putting Cardiff 2–0 up, but on loan striker Deon Burton pulled one back for Stoke late on. So Stoke went into the second leg at the notoriously hostile Ninian Park 2–1 down and with both sides missing chances the match was 0–0 after 90 minutes and in the final minute of injury time James O'Connor scored to send the match into extra time. And Stoke scored again via an O'Connor shot which deflected in of Souleymane Oularé to give Stoke the most dramatic victory. The final against Brentford was not as dramatic as Stoke won comfortably 2–0 thanks to goals from Deon Burton and an own goal from Ben Burgess. So with Stoke celebrating a return to the second tier after a longer than hoped spell in the third tier the feeling around the club was good with hopes that it could be the start of a return to the top flight. However, despite finally achieving promotion via the play-offs at the third attempt manager Gudjon Thordarson's contract was not renewed.

FA Cup
After avoiding potential upsets against non-league Lewes and Third Division Halifax Town Stoke were handed a third round tie against Everton. The "Toffees" won a close match 1–0 thanks to an Alan Stubbs free-kick in front of a capacity crowd of 28,218.

League Cup
Stoke lost to Oldham Athletic in the first round via a penalty shoot-out.

League Trophy
With priorities on gaining promotion Gudjon decided to play a second string side against Blackpool giving debuts to some of the club's best academy players most notably Andy Wilkinson. They gave a decent account of themselves losing 3–2.

Final league table

Results
Stoke's score comes first

Legend

Pre-Season friendlies

Football League Second Division

Second Division play-offs

FA Cup

League Cup

League Trophy

Squad statistics

References

Stoke City F.C. seasons
Stoke City